Zoungou is a department or commune of Ganzourgou Province in central-eastern Burkina Faso. Its capital lies at the town of Zoungou. According to the 1996 census the department has a total population of 29,753.

Towns and villages
 Zoungou	(1 426 inhabitants) (capital)
 Badnogo	(286 inhabitants)
 Bitoungou	(473 inhabitants)
 Dakaongo	(1 245 inhabitants)
 Darsalam	(858 inhabitants)
 Gandaogo	(2 277 inhabitants)
 Goghin	(320 inhabitants)
 Kuilkanda	(1 136 inhabitants)
 Kuilmasga	(979 inhabitants)
 Nobtenga	(707 inhabitants)
 Ouavoussé	(1 454 inhabitants)
 Paspanga	(1 297 inhabitants)
 Ramatoulaye	(619 inhabitants)
 Silmiougou	(1 016 inhabitants)
 Tanghin	(1 274 inhabitants)
 Tansèga	(2 273 inhabitants)
 Tameswéoghin	(1 201 inhabitants)
 Tamidou	(343 inhabitants)
 Taonsghin	(1 045 inhabitants)
 Toéssin	(689 inhabitants)
 Waada	(2 522 inhabitants)
 Wemyaoghin	(1 249 inhabitants)
 Yamganghin	(1 034 inhabitants)
 Zantonré	(1 050 inhabitants)
 Zorbimba	(1 779 inhabitants)

References

Departments of Burkina Faso
Ganzourgou Province